6239 Minos is a bright sub-kilometer near-Earth object, classified as a potentially hazardous asteroid of the Apollo group. It was discovered on 31 August 1989, by American astronomer couple Carolyn and Eugene Shoemaker at the Palomar Observatory in California. It makes frequent close approaches to Mars, Earth, and Venus.

References

External links 
 
 
 

006239
006239
Discoveries by Eugene Merle Shoemaker
Discoveries by Carolyn S. Shoemaker
Named minor planets
Earth-crossing asteroids
Venus-crossing asteroids
19890831